"I Get It In" is the first single from Omarion's third studio album Ollusion (2010). The song was released on November 24, 2009. The song was previously recorded with Lil Wayne but re-recorded and released featuring Gucci Mane. The leaking of the original song led to Omarion being dropped out of Young Money according to Mack Maine's Twitter. However, Lil Wayne, Young Money's CEO, said that Omarion left the group because of other opportunities that he received.

Chart performance
"I Get It In" debuted at number 99 on the Billboard Hot 100 for the week of November 14, 2009, but left the next week. It reappeared on the chart at number 98 the week of November 28 and peaked at number 83 the week of December 19, staying on the chart for seven weeks.

Music video
A music video for "I Get It In" was released on November 9, 2009. Omarion revealed that it is dedicated to Michael Jackson. Talking about the video, he said, "When I pull up, I’m getting out the car, we start choreography and then it keeps going until the end of the video. I’m telling you right now, this is probably one of the dopest videos you’ve seen in a long time because it’s a concept".

Charts

References

External links
 

2009 singles
2009 songs
Omarion songs
Gucci Mane songs
Songs written by Gucci Mane
Songs written by J. Valentine
Songs written by Omarion